169/NEAT is a periodic comet in the Solar System. It is the parent body of the alpha Capricornids meteor shower in Late July. 169/NEAT may be related to comet P/2003 T12 (SOHO). It comes to perihelion (closest approach to the Sun) on 9 July 2022. On 13 July 2022 passed  from Venus. On 11 August 2026 it will pass  from Earth and then come to perihelion on 21 September 2026.

169P is a low activity comet roughly a few kilometers in diameter. 169P and the smaller body P/2003 T12 likely fragmented from a parent body roughly 2900 years ago.

References

External links 
 Orbital simulation from JPL (Java) / Horizons Ephemeris
 169P on Seiichi Yoshida's comet list

Periodic comets
169P
0169

Meteor shower progenitors
Comets in 2022